Thilo Friedrich Maatsch (born 13 August 1900 in Braunschweig; died 20 March 1983 in Königslutter) was a German artist and an exponent of abstract art, constructivism and concrete art.

Life 
Whilst visiting exhibitions in his youth he came in touch with art. Especially the upcoming modernism affected him and his work of art a lot. 18 years after his 
birth he founded with Johannes Molzahn and Rudolf Jahns the 
"Gesellschaft der Freunde junger Kunst" (Society of the adorer of young art) which were joined by several distinguished artist as e.g. Lyonel Feininger and Paul Klee. The collector Otto Ralfs supported this organisation and Kandinsky designed the signet. 
Maatsch's circle of friends and acquaintances ranked among  the aforementioned 
artists, László Moholy-Nagy, William Wauer and Lothar Schreyer. 
Kandinsky nurtured Maatsch's talent and he admired him like his own 
father. Due to financial problems it was not possible for Maatsch to study at the Bauhaus, because of his young family he also had to nourish. 
But his desire for studies remained not any longer unfulfilled. Moholy-Nagy, Kandinsky and Klee permitted him to study in their studios. Most probably Kandinsky together with the Bauhaus figured out a permission for Maatsch to attend Bauhaus in Berlin and Weimar in his holidays (he worked as a teacher in Königslutter) without paying fees.

In 1925 he joined the November Group and from this year onwards till 1932 he participated annually in the renowned Große Berliner Kunstausstellung. In 1927 Herwarth Walden, one of the most important discoverers and promoters of German avant-garde art in the early twentieth century, arranged for Maatsch an exhibition in his prestigious gallery "Der Sturm". Determined by the Nazi policy his art work was considered as degenerated and he withered on the vine. Maatsch's rediscovery ensued 1966.

Public collections 
 Sprengel Museum, Hanover, Germany
 Museum Ritter, Germany
 City of Salzgitter (art collection), Germany
 Museum Haus Konstruktiv, Zurich Switzerland
 Dubniczay-House, Collection Carl Laszlo (Károly László), Veszprém Hungary
 Indianapolis Museum of Art USA

External links 
 Early paintings of Thilo Maatsch
 Postwar works by Thilo Maatsch
 Entry for Thilo Maatsch on the Union List of Artist Names

1900 births
1983 deaths
Concrete art
Bauhaus
20th-century German painters
20th-century German male artists
German male painters
Constructivism
Artists from Braunschweig